Khawaja Imran Nazir is a Pakistani politician who was a Member of the Provincial Assembly of the Punjab, from 2008 to May 2018 and from August 2018 till January 2023.

Early life and education
He was born on 18 November 1974 in Lahore .

He graduated in 2005 from University of the Punjab and has a degree  of Bachelor of Arts.

Political career
He was elected to the Provincial Assembly of the Punjab as a candidate of Pakistan Muslim League (N) (PML-N) from Constituency PP-139 (Lahore-III) in 2008 Pakistani general election. He received 29,955 votes and defeated Chaudhry Muhammad Asghar, a candidate of Pakistan Peoples Party (PPP). In the same election, he also ran for the seat of the Provincial Assembly of the Punjab as an independent candidate from Constituency PP-140 (Lahore-IV), from Constituency PP-146 (Lahore-X), from Constituency PP-147 (Lahore-XI), from Constituency PP-149 (Lahore-XIII) and from Constituency PP-151 (Lahore-XV) but was unsuccessful and lost all seats.

He was re-elected to the Provincial Assembly of the Punjab as a candidate of PML-N from Constituency PP-137 (Lahore-I) in 2013 Pakistani general election. He received 50,936 votes and defeated Muhammd Yasir, a candidate of Pakistan Tehreek-e-Insaf (PTI).

In December 2013, he was appointed as Parliamentary Secretary for health.

He was inducted into the provincial Punjab cabinet of Chief Minister Shehbaz Sharif in November 2016 and was made Provincial Minister of Punjab for primary and secondary health.

He was re-elected to Provincial Assembly of the Punjab as a candidate of PML-N from Constituency PP-153 (Lahore-X) in 2018 Pakistani general election.

References

Living people
Punjab MPAs 2013–2018
1974 births
Pakistan Muslim League (N) MPAs (Punjab)
Punjab MPAs 2008–2013
Punjab MPAs 2018–2023